The Cooma Creek, a mostlyperennial river that is part of the Murrumbidgee catchment within the Murray–Darling basin, is located in the Monaro region of New South Wales, Australia.

Course and features 

The Cooma Creek (technically a river) rises below The Peak, southeast of Snow Hill and west southwest of Brick Kiln Hill, part of the Great Dividing Range, and flows generally north and then north by east, joined by three minor tributaries and flowing through the town of  before reaching its confluence with Rock Flat Creek near the locality of Chakola. Rock Flat Creek continues to the Numeralla River, which is a tributary of the Murrumbidgee River. The Cooma Creek descends  over its  course.

The Snowy Mountains Highway crosses Cooma Creek in Cooma; and the Monaro Highway crosses Cooma Creek at Bunyan.

See also 

 List of rivers of New South Wales (A-K)
 Rivers of New South Wales

References

External links
Upper Murrumbidgee Demonstration Reach  1.22MB
 

Rivers of New South Wales
Tributaries of the Murrumbidgee River
Snowy Mountains Highway